Elections were held in Illinois on Tuesday, November 2, 1976.

Primaries were held on March 16, 1976.

In order to, per Constitution of Illinois, allow for all statewide executive offices to be up for election in the 1978 midterms, all statewide executive offices up for election in 1976 were only elected to two-year terms.

Election information
In order to, per Constitution of Illinois, allow for all statewide  executive offices to be up for election in the 1978 midterms, all statewide executive offices up for election in 1976 were only elected to two-year terms.

This is would be the last time that any election for a nstatewide executive office would be held in Illinois during a presidential election year, until 2016, when a special election was held for comptroller.

Turnout
Turnout in the primary election was 21.55%, with a total of 1,239,487 ballots cast. 669,210 Democratic and 570,277 Republican primary ballots were cast.

Turnout during the general election was 77.38%, with 4,838,182 ballots cast.

Federal elections

United States President 

Illinois voted for the Republican ticket of Gerald Ford and Bob Dole.

United States House 

All 24 Illinois seats in the United States House of Representatives were up for election in 1976.

Republicans flipped one seat, making the composition of Illinois' House delegation consist of 12 Democrats and 12 Republicans.

State elections

Governor and Lieutenant Governor

Incumbent Governor Dan Walker, a Democrat, had been defeated by Michael J. Howlett in the Democratic primary, while incumbent Lieutenant Governor Neil Hartigan was renominated in the Democratic lieutenant gubernatorial primary. The Republican ticket of James R. Thompson and David C. O'Neal won the election.

Attorney General 

Incumbent Attorney General William J. Scott, a Republican, was elected to a third term.

Democratic primary
President of the Illinois Senate Cecil Partee narrowly defeated Superintendent of the Illinois Department of Registration and Education Ronald E. Stackler in the Democratic primary.

Republican primary
Incumbent William J. Scott won the Republican primary, running unopposed.

General election

Secretary of State 

Incumbent Secretary of State Michael Howlett, a Democrat, did not seek a second term, instead opting to run for governor. Democrat Alan J. Dixon was elected to succeed him in office.

Democratic primary
Illinois Treasurer Alan J. Dixon won the Democratic primary, defeating Illinois State Senator Vince Demuzio.

Republican primary
Illinois State Senator William C. Harris won the Republican primary, running unopposed.

General election

Comptroller 

Incumbent Comptroller George W. Lindberg, a Republican running for a second term, was defeated by Democrat Michael Bakalis.

Democratic primary
Former Illinois Superintendent of Public Instruction Michael Bakalis won the Democratic primary, defeating Director of the Illinois State Department of General Services Roland Burris.

Republican primary
Incumbent George W. Lindberg won the Republican primary, running unopposed.

General election

State Senate
Seats of the Illinois Senate were up for election in 1976. Democrats retained control of the chamber.

State House of Representatives
Seats in the Illinois House of Representatives were up for election in 1976. Democrats retained control of the chamber.

State House of Representatives
Seats in the Illinois House of Representatives were up for election in 1974. Democrats flipped control of the chamber.

Trustees of University of Illinois

An election was held for three of nine seats for Trustees of University of Illinois system. 

The election saw the reelection of first-term Democrats William D. Forsyth Jr., George W. Howard III, and Earl L. Neal.

Judicial elections
Multiple judicial positions were up for election in 1976.

Local elections
Local elections were held.

References

 
Illinois